Lučina ( or Łuczyna) is a river in Moravian-Silesian Region, Czech Republic. It is the tributary of the Ostravice River to which it enters in Ostrava. It originates in Beskids and then flows northwestward through Horní Bludovice and Dolní Bludovice, near Havířov. Žermanice Dam is built on the river. River is distinct for its meanders which are protected as a unique natural landmark.

The book Most nad Łucyną (The Bridge on Łucyna) by Polish poet Wiesław Adam Berger is centered on the river.

Rivers of the Moravian-Silesian Region
Frýdek-Místek District
Karviná District
Cieszyn Silesia